Sanford's Opera Troupe was an American blackface minstrel troupe headed by Samuel S. Sanford (1821-1905). The troupe began in 1853 under the name Sanford's Minstrels. The name changed that same year to Sanford's Opera Troupe. The lineup changed in 1856 and again in 1857, when they disbanded.

Notes

References
Mahar, William J. (1999). Behind the Burnt Cork Mask: Early Blackface Minstrelsy and Antebellum American Popular Culture. Chicago: University of Illinois Press.

1853 establishments in the United States
Blackface minstrel troupes
American comedy troupes